Mar Yar Project is a 2014 Burmese drama film, directed by Wyne starring Nay Toe, Thet Mon Myint and Phway Phway. The film, produced by Moe Kaung Kin Film Production premiered Myanmar on March 14, 2014.

Cast
Nay Toe as Linn Lu Lin
Thet Mon Myint as Moe Kyo May
Phway Phway as Swae Nhyoe Shin
Kyaw Kyaw as Moe Thet Tant

References

2014 films
2010s Burmese-language films
Burmese drama films
Films shot in Myanmar
Films directed by Wyne
2014 drama films